List of Iranian assassinations refers to a list of alleged and confirmed assassinations, reported to have been conducted by the Islamic Republic of Iran and previously by the Pahlavi Dynasty  and several underground Resistance Opposition groups.

It includes attempts on notable persons who were reported to have been specifically targeted by the various Iranian security and intelligence, most notably Kurdish dissidents of the Kurdish Democratic Party of Iran in 1980s and 1990s.

Prior to the establishment of the Islamic Republic in 1979, the Organization of Intelligence and National Security also allegedly performed a number of political motivated assassinations against dissidents and opposition leaders.

By Pahlavi regime (1953–1979)

By the Islamic Republic of Iran

By Resistance Opposition groups

See also
 Targeted Killing in International Law

Iranian
Assassinations
Targeted killing
Assassinations